The Technological Corporation of Andalusia (Corporación Tecnológica de Andalucía, CTA) in the autonomous community of Andalusia, Spain is the largest public-private partnership in Spain linking scientific and industrial innovation. The project was presented publicly 27 July 2005, and the official act constituting it was put into effect 10 October 2005. As of 2010 its president is Joaquín Moya-Angeler Cabrera.

It is a private foundation promoted by the Council of Innovation, Science and Business of the Autonomous Government of Andalusia (Consejería de Innovación, Ciencia y Empresa de la Junta de Andalucía) to encourage collaboration between the scientific and commercial communities in Andalusia. It brings together the Universities and Centers of Investigation, innovative businesses, and public administration in Andalusia, forming Andalusia's (and Spain's) largest research and development complex.

Constitution
The CTA governing board (Patronato) includes both businesses (including, but not limited to, Airbus, Banco Santander, La Caixa, Endesa, Iberdrola, and Heineken) and research entities. The CTA has at least 133 member organizations as of 19 March 2010.

To start the CTA, 44 founding organizations from the private sector provided one million euros each; the total amount was matched by the Council of Innovation, Science and Business through the Andalusian Innovation and Development Agency (Agencia de Innovación y Desarrollo de Andalucía), for a total of 88 million euros. The current capital of the organization is over 107 million euros.

Activities
As of February 2010, CTA has approved 301 research and development projects. with incentives adding up to over 46 million euros. The total investment in the projects has been over 151 million euros. More than 160 investigative groups have been involved, representing all of the universities in Andalusia, and organisms such as the Superior Council for Scientific Investigations (Consejo Superior de Investigaciones Científicas, Csic), the Andalusian Institute for Research and Training in Agriculture, Food and Fisheries (Instituto de Investigación y Formación Agraria y Pesquera, Ifapa), and public hospitals.

Notes

External links
 Corporación Tecnológica de Andalucía, official page
 Consejería de Innovación, Ciencia y Empresa, official page

Institutions of Andalusia
Research institutes in Andalusia